Qarah Palchuq (also Romanized as Qarah Pālchūq and Qareh Pālchūq) is a village in Khvor Khvoreh Rural District, in the Central District of Bijar County, Kurdistan Province, Iran. At the 2006 census, its population was 200, in 50 families. The village is populated by Kurds with an Azerbaijani minority.

References 

Towns and villages in Bijar County
Kurdish settlements in Kurdistan Province
Azerbaijani settlements in Kurdistan Province